Raorchestes tuberohumerus (Kudremukh bush frog or knob handed shrub frog) is a species of frog in the family Rhacophoridae. It is endemic to the Western Ghats, India, where it is found in Karnataka and Kerala states.

Description
This small sized shrub frog (male snout-vent length ) is diagnosed by the following combination of characters: Snout sub elliptical in shape; iris golden brown; the humerus bone slightly projects on the ventral region near shoulders; light grey dorsum with spinular projections and prominent yellow patches with brown on the groin region.

Ecology and Natural History
Raorchestes tuberohumerus are seen on shrubs in forests, plantations, home gardens and road side vegetation between 500 and 1500 m elevation. 
They are known to face down towards ground and vocalize on dead leaves on shrubs.

Current known localities
Wayanad, Muthanga, Madikeri, Kudremukh, Agumbe, Jog, Kempholey, Anashi, Sakleshpur

Gallery

References

External links

 

tuberohumerus
Frogs of India
Endemic fauna of the Western Ghats
Taxonomy articles created by Polbot
Amphibians described in 2003